Chodaganga was King of Polonnaruwa in the twelfth century, who ruled from 1196 to 1197. He succeeded his uncle Vikramabahu II, whom he usurped as king of Polonnaruwa and ruled for nine months before he was deposed and deprived of his eyes by the General Senevirat who installed Lilavati, wife of Parakramabahu I. Chodaganga was also a nephew of Nissanka Malla.

See also
 List of Sri Lankan monarchs
 History of Sri Lanka

References

External links
 Kings & Rulers of Sri Lanka
 Codrington's Short History of Ceylon

Monarchs of Polonnaruwa
C
C
C